Ian J. Arthur  (born December 20, 1984) is a Canadian politician, first elected to the Legislative Assembly of Ontario in the 2018 provincial election. He represents the riding of Kingston and the Islands as a member of the Ontario New Democratic Party.  He was officially sworn in as the Member of Provincial Parliament on July 10, 2018.  As a member of the Official Opposition, Arthur currently serves on the Finance and Economic Affairs committee of the Legislative Assembly.  He served as the Official Opposition Critic for the Environment until February 1, 2021, when he was appointed the Critic for Small Business Recovery and Reopening Main Street.

Prior to being elected, he was the executive chef at well-known Kingston restaurant Chez Piggy and coached rowing for Queen's University.

Background
Arthur was born in Corner Brook, Newfoundland, on December 20, 1984. Moving with his parents at age two to Lyndhurst, Ontario, Arthur grew up on a small organic market garden and farm. He attended Sydenham High School before studying International Development and Political Studies at Trent University. While completing his undergraduate degree, Arthur studied abroad at the University of Accra in Accra, Ghana and interned with the Canadian High Commissioner to Ghana. Arthur was the former head chef of the Chez Piggy restaurant in Kingston. Arthur is a former member of the Kingston, Frontenac, Lennox, and Addington Food Policy Council. He is a member of the Kingston Action Group for a Basic Income Guarantee and sits on the board of directors for Switch Kingston, a Kingston-based not-for-profit association that promotes job creation and investment in sustainable energy.

Provincial politics
Arthur secured the Ontario NDP nomination on March 1, 2018. He defeated Georgina Riel and Rob Matheson in the first round of voting to secure the nomination. In the 2018 Ontario general election, Arthur was elected in Kingston and the Islands, defeating Ontario Liberal candidate Sophie Kiwala by 6,385 votes. This is the first time Kingston and the Islands elected a New Democrat since Gary Wilson won the riding in the 1990 Ontario general election.

Since being elected, Arthur has been appointed as Official Critic for Environment and Sustainability. As an advocate for fighting climate change, Arthur has highlighted in his speeches in Legislature numerous environmental and ecological issues with several Progressive Conservative bills. He was named to the Standing Committee on Finance and Economic Affairs. In 2019 Arthur was appointed to the Executive of the Council of State Governments Eastern Regional Conference by Speaker Ted Arnot.

On December 14, 2021, Arthur announced he would not seek re-election in the 2022 Ontario general election.

Electoral record

References

1984 births
Living people
Ontario New Democratic Party MPPs
21st-century Canadian politicians
People from Kingston, Ontario
Canadian male chefs